Chehreqan (also Romanized as Chehreqān and Chehraqān; also known as Charāghān and Cherāghān) is a village in Khosrow Beyk Rural District, Milajerd District, Komijan County, Markazi Province, Iran. At the 2006 census, its population was 1,580, in 415 families. The inhabitants speak Tati.

References 

Populated places in Komijan County